"Color of Your Life" is a song performed by Polish singer Michał Szpak. The song was released as a digital download on 11 March 2016 through Sony Music Entertainment Poland as the fourth single from his debut studio album Byle być sobą (2015). The song was chosen by public broadcaster TVP to represent Poland in the Eurovision Song Contest 2016, and reached the 8th position in the final.

The single peaked at number 34 on the Polish Airplay Chart.

Eurovision Song Contest

Krajowe Eliminacje 2016
Krajowe Eliminacje 2016 was the national final organised by TVP in order to select the Polish entry for the Eurovision Song Contest 2016. The show took place on 5 March 2016 at the TVP Headquarters in Warsaw, hosted by Artur Orzech. Public televoting exclusively selected the winner. The show was broadcast on TVP1 and TVP Polonia as well as streamed online at the broadcaster's website eurowizja.tvp.pl.

The televised final took place on 5 March 2016. Nine entries competed and the winner, "Color of Your Life" performed by Michał Szpak, was determined entirely by a public vote. He represented Poland in the Eurovision Song Contest 2016 in Stockholm, Sweden, performing in the second semi-final on 12 May 2016. He qualified for the final and finished the contest at 8th position with 229 points.

Music video
The official music video for the song was uploaded to YouTube on 21 December 2015.

Track listing

Charts

Certifications

References

Eurovision songs of Poland
Eurovision songs of 2016
Sony Music singles
2016 songs
2016 singles